The 19th Venice Biennale, held in 1934, was an exhibition of international contemporary art, with 16 participating nations. The Venice Biennale takes place biennially in Venice, Italy.

References

Bibliography

Further reading 

 
 
 
 
 
 
 
 
 
 
 
 
 
 

1934 in art
1934 in Italy
Venice Biennale exhibitions